The Pace That Kills may refer to:

 The Pace That Kills (1928 film), silent film
 The Pace That Kills (1935 film)